is a public park that straddles the wards of Meguro and Shinagawa in Tokyo, Japan. The park's name derives from the Japanese term , meaning an experimental forestry station.

Overview
 The thickest tree in the park is a zelkova with a trunk circumference of 3.82 m. The tallest tree is a poplar with a height of 35.5 m.
 Blue butterflies (Antigius attilia) can be found on old Chinese cork oak trees in the park. They are rare in the wild in Tokyo.
 A small valley runs from north to south in the center of the park. This is the remnant of an irrigation ditch.
 In addition to a forest with large trees, there is a lawn plaza, a day camp facility, a pond for children to play in in the summer, and a ground on the west side that can be used for baseball and soccer training.

Access
 By train: 9 minutes’ walk from Fudō-mae Station or Musashi-Koyama Station on the Tōkyū Meguro Line

See also
 Parks and gardens in Tokyo
 National Parks of Japan

References

 Website of Tokyo Metropolitan Park Association (in Japanese)

External links
 Website of Let’s Go to the Park with 1,000 yen (in Japanese)

Parks and gardens in Tokyo